Antonín Buček (born 24 February 1984 in Ostrava) is a Czech football player who currently plays for FC Odra Petřkovice.

Buček played for Czech youth national teams since the under-16 level.

Career
After two years, Buček returned to FC Odra Petřkovice for the second time.

References

External links
Profile at Baník Ostrava website
Profile at Baník Ostrava website

1984 births
Living people
Czech footballers
Czech expatriate footballers
Czech Republic youth international footballers
Czech Republic under-21 international footballers
Association football goalkeepers
Czech First League players
Czech National Football League players
Kazakhstan Premier League players
I liga players
FK Chmel Blšany players
FC Baník Ostrava players
FK Ústí nad Labem players
FK Baník Sokolov players
FC Akzhayik players
GKS Katowice players
FC Hlučín players
FK Frýdek-Místek players
1. SC Znojmo players
Expatriate footballers in Poland
Expatriate footballers in Kazakhstan
Czech expatriate sportspeople in Poland
Czech expatriate sportspeople in Kazakhstan
Sportspeople from Ostrava